Robert Rich (born 23 August 1963) is an ambient musician and composer based in California, United States. With a discography spanning over 30 years, he has been called a figure whose sound has greatly influenced today's ambient music, New-age music, and even IDM.

Biography

Early life
At an early age, Rich thought he disliked music. Around age 12, he began growing succulent plants as a hobby. He would leave a radio tuned to classical music for his plants. This experience influenced his interest in avant-garde and minimal composition.

In the 5th grade, he began studying viola and voice. He never completed his formal training because he became uncomfortable with reading musical notation. He began looking for ways to generate sounds similar to those he heard in his mind. He started improvising on his parents' piano to hear the sound of the sustained strings droning in tonal combinations, in the style of Charlemagne Palestine. He began building his own synthesizer in 1976 when he was 13 years old. In the years that followed, he adopted several musical influences ranging from John Cage and Terry Riley to Cluster and Klaus Schulze.

In 1979, he began working with a musician named Rick Davies, creating experimental music inspired by a wide range of avant-garde and art rock influences. This was the beginning of a long-term working relationship between these two artists.

In 1980, he bought a lap steel guitar from a pawn shop. With it, he began experimenting with alternate tunings and developed a fluid and almost vocal tone that he continues to use. Around that time, he had also learned to overcome the limitations of his synthesizer rig with spring reverb, tape delays and custom-made feedback systems that he created himself.

1980s: sleep concerts and early career
During Rich's time at Stanford University in the 1980s, he became well known in the San Francisco Bay Area for giving live night-time performances for somnolent or sleeping audiences. These were experiments to influence REM cycle sleep with auditory stimulus. They were usually nine hours long and lasted from 10 p.m. to 7 a.m. During these performances, he would generate abstract drones and atmospheres while the audience dozed in sleeping bags that they brought themselves. In the morning he would end the concert with piano solos. He would then serve tea to the audience.

During this time, he released four albums on cassette: Sunyata (1982), Trances (1983), Drones (1983), and his first live album titled Live (1984). The first of these was recorded when he was 18. The music on these albums reflects similar drone music atmospheres to those of his sleep concert series.

Rich applied to study at Stanford’s Center for Computer Research in Music and Acoustics. He scheduled a meeting with John Chowning, the founder of the class and inventor of FM synthesis. When Chowning saw Rich’s first three albums, Rich was approved for the class. This was a unique privilege for an undergraduate with incomplete formal music training.

In 1983, he and Rick Davies together with a bassist named Andrew McGowan formed a group called "Urdu". It performed several live concerts in the San Francisco Bay area. The group dissolved after a live radio broadcast in 1984. Some of the group's recorded material was released as a self-titled album in 1985.

In 1987, he released an album titled Numena. This was the beginning of a new sound for Rich. It was his first album to explore complex rhythmic patterns, a wider range of acoustic instrumentation, and just intonation. It was also his first album to be released on CD originally.

1990s–2000s
In the years that followed he developed a complex range of sounds founded upon the seamless integration of electronic, electric, and acoustic instrumentation, and the exploration of complex just tunings. His music continues to tend toward the organic and much of it is based on a concept in synthesis he refers to as glurp. His interest in using unique sounds has inspired him to create a large collection of original field recordings and homemade instruments. One of these instruments is a range of flutes made from PVC pipe.

His interest in unique sounds has also given him work as a sound designer for synthesizer presets and for E-mu Systems’ Proteus 3 and Morpheus sound modules. He has also designed sounds for films including Pitch Black and Behind Enemy Lines, a series of sampling discs called Things that Go Bump in the Night, and a library of Acid Loops called Liquid Planet. He has also helped develop the MIDI micro-tuning specification, which is the standard used to create justly tuned compositions in MIDI.

His collaborators over the years have included Steve Roach, Brian “Lustmord” Williams, Lisa Moskow, Alio Die, and Ian Boddy.

In 1992, he formed a new group called Amoeba. The group has released three albums featuring ex-Urdu members Rick Davies and Andrew McGowan at different times.

In 2001, he released an album titled Somnium, a 7-hour album divided into three tracks on one DVD video. This album was a recreation of the sleep concert environment he created during the 1980s at Stanford. Although not officially recognized, many people believe it to be the longest artist album of all time.

In 2004, he released an album of piano solos titled Open Window. This album documents his improvised piano style that has been part of his live concerts for decades. It was recorded on a 1925 vintage A.B. Chase baby grand piano.

On March 11, 2005, Robert suffered a hand injury while cleaning a glass jug, accidentally slipping and falling on top of it. During the recovery process, he continued to record new material and tour. He also constructed end-blown flutes from PVC pipe that are more easily played with limited right-hand dexterity.

During his 2006 tour, Rich performed in front of a film created by visual artist Daniel Colvin as a backdrop. After the tour, he created a score for the film, which was released on CD and DVD in 2007 under the title Atlas Dei. In 2007 he also released the album Illumination, a companion soundtrack of a multimedia installation by Michael Somoroff, and a collaboration album with touch guitarist Markus Reuter.

One of Rich's other interests is food. He maintains a website of recipes and other food-related topics called Flavor Notes. He also has a long list of recipes for wild mushrooms.

Discography

Solo studio and live albums
1982: Sunyata (reissued 2013 on Sunyata & Inner Landscapes)
1983: Trances (reissued 1994 on Trances/Drones)
1983: Drones (reissued 1994 on Trances/Drones)
1984: Live (live)
1987: Inner Landscapes (live) (reissued 2013 on Sunyata & Inner Landscapes)
1987: Numena (reissued 1997 on Numena + Geometry)
1989: Rainforest
1991: Gaudí
1991: Geometry (reissued 1997 on Numena + Geometry)
1994: Propagation
1994: Night Sky Replies (limited edition 3" CD)
1996: A Troubled Resting Place (collects lone tracks)
1998: Below Zero (collects lone tracks)
1998: Seven Veils
2000: Humidity (live, 3 discs)
2001: Somnium (audio in DVD-video format)
2001: Bestiary
2003: Temple of the Invisible
2003: Calling Down the Sky
2004: Open Window
2005: Echo of Small Things
2006: Electric Ladder
2007: Music from Atlas Dei
2007: Illumination
2009: Live Archive
2010: Ylang
2011: Medicine Box
2012: Nest
2013: Morphology
2014: Premonitions 1980-1985
2014: Perpetual (A Somnium Continuum)
2015: Filaments
2016: What We Left Behind
2016: Foothills: Robert Rich Live on KFJC, 28 May 2014
2016: Vestiges
2017: Live at the Gatherings 2015
2018: The Biode
2019: Tactile Ground
2020: Offering to the Morning Fog
2020: Neurogenesis

Collaboration albums
1985: Urdu by Urdu
1990: Strata (with Steve Roach)
1992: Soma (with Steve Roach)
1993: Eye Catching by Amoeba
1995: Yearning (with Lisa Moskow)
1995: Stalker (with Brian “Lustmord” Williams)
1997: Watchful by Amoeba
1997: Fissures (with Stefano Musso/Alio Die)
2000: Pivot by Amoeba
2002: Outpost (with Ian Boddy)
2005: Lithosphere (with Ian Boddy)
2007: Eleven Questions (with Markus Reuter)
2008: React (with Ian Boddy)
2008: Zerkalo (with Faryus)
2014: A Scattering Time by Meridiem (with Percy Howard)
2017: Lift a Feather to the Flood (with Markus Reuter)

DVDs
2007 Atlas Dei

Sources

Interview (January 2005), Ambient Visions website.
Liner notes, Sunyata (1982).
Essay by Rick Davies from the liner notes, Trances/Drones (1983/1994).
Liner notes, Numena + Geometry (1987/1991). Fathom 11077-2.

External links
RobertRich.com – official website
Valley-Entertainment.com – Hearts of Space Records Artist Page

RRich.com/Amoeba - Amoeba’s official website
 - Tribute site endorsed by Robert Rich
FlavorNotes.com - Robert Rich’s Flavor Notes: Food, Wine, Restaurants & Recipes
AtlasDei.com - Atlas Dei: A DVD by Daniel Colvin and Robert Rich

New-age musicians
Ambient musicians
Microtonal composers
Living people
1963 births
American male composers
American experimental musicians
20th-century American male musicians